Andreu Ramos Isus (born 19 January 1989) is a Spanish professional footballer who plays as a defender for Santa Coloma in Andorra.

Career
Ramos started his senior career in Barcelona with their former clubs CF Damm and Barcelona. After that, he played for UD Ibiza, Hamilton Academical, CF Balaguer, and UDA Gramenet. In 2011, he signed for King Fung in the Hong Kong Premier League, where he made seventeen appearances and scored seven goals.

References

External links 
 Andreu Ramos: "The life of a farmer has always fascinated me as much or more than that of a footballer"
 At the foot of the skyscrapers 
 Hong Kong, Paraguay, the League
 Ramos, from Damm to Udinese 
 Ca l'Andreu: from the football field to the Alt Urgell fields

1989 births
Living people
Spanish footballers
Association football defenders
UD Ibiza players
Hamilton Academical F.C. players
CF Balaguer footballers
UDA Gramenet footballers
Club Guaraní players
FC Santa Coloma players